= Urohaustoriidae =

Scientific classification
- Domain: Eukaryota
- Kingdom: Animalia
- Phylum: Arthropoda
- Class: Malacostraca
- Order: Amphipoda
- Superfamily: Haustorioidea
- Family: Urohaustoriidae

Family of crustaceans

Urohaustoriidae is a family of crustaceans belonging to the order Amphipoda.

Genera:

- Dirimus Barnard & Drummond, 1982
- Gheegerus Barnard & Drummond, 1982
- Huarpe Barnard & Clarke, 1982
- Narunius Barnard & Drummond, 1982
- Nepelle Barnard & Drummond, 1991
- Tottungus Barnard & Drummond, 1982
- Tuldarus Barnard & Drummond, 1982
- Urohaustorius Sheard, 1936
- Warragaia Berents, 1985
